Kara-Kulja (قارا-قۇلجا; , Kara-Kul’dzha) is the center of Kara-Kulja District in Osh Region of Kyrgyzstan.

It is located in the mountain valley of the river Kara Darya, southeast and upstream from Uzgen. Its population was 15,616 in 2021.

Population

Climate
Kara-Kulja has a hot, dry-summer continental climate (Köppen climate classification Dsa). There is more rainfall in winter than in summer. About  of precipitation falls annually.

References

Populated places in Osh Region